Bernardo de Benedictis (died 1607) was a Roman Catholic prelate who served as Bishop of Castellaneta (1585–1607).

Biography
On 28 Jan 1585, he was appointed during the papacy of Pope Gregory XIII as Bishop of Castellaneta.
On 12 Mar 1585, he was consecrated bishop by Agostino Valier, Bishop of Verona, with Filippo Mocenigo, Archbishop of Nicosia, and Federico Cornaro, Bishop of Padua, serving as co-consecrators. 
He served as Bishop of Castellaneta  until his death in 1607.

While bishop, he was the principal co-consecrator of Aloisio Grimani, Archbishop of Candia (1605).

References

External links and additional sources
 (for Chronology of Bishops)
 (for Chronology of Bishops)

17th-century Italian Roman Catholic bishops
Bishops appointed by Pope Gregory XIII
1607 deaths